Joan Danziger (born 1934 New York City) is an American sculptor. She is known for her large sculptures of beetles and hybrid human-animals.

Life
Danziger grew up in Queens. She graduated from Cornell University with a B.F.A., and studied at the Art Students League, and the Accademia di Belle Arti di Roma in Rome.

Her work has been shown at the Morris Museum, Rutgers University, and the New Jersey State Museum. Her work is in: the New Orleans Museum of Art; the Smithsonian American Art Museum, the [[National Museum of Women in the Arts]Reading Public Museum, Reading PA, Childrens Museum of Pittsburgh, Pittsburgh PA, Susquehanna Art Museum. She is known for her large sculptures of beetles and hybrid human-animal forms.

She resides and works in Washington, D.C.

Her image is included in the iconic 1972 poster Some Living American Women Artists by Mary Beth Edelson.

Reviews

References

External links
Ree and Jun Kaneko, Sculptress Joan Danzinger
October Gathering, 2001, by Joan Danziger, The Sculpture Foundation

1934 births
Cornell University College of Architecture, Art, and Planning alumni
Living people
Artists from New York City
20th-century American women artists
Sculptors from New York (state)
Art Students League of New York alumni
21st-century American women